The Remixes: Oso Eho Foni & Aftos Pou Perimeno is a rare EP released by Greek pop singer Anna Vissi in 1997 by Minos EMI.  The single featured the 1980 hit "Oso Eho Foni" and the 1979 hit "Aftos Pou Perimeno", both of which are Minos EMI back catalogue tracks, in remastered remix versions by Dan Taylor and Alex Palamaras, which gained airplay in radio stations and clubs in Greece.

Track listing
"Oso Eho Foni" (The Revival Mix)
"Oso Eho Foni" (Immaculate Club Mix)
"Aftos Pou Perimeno" (Disco In The House Mix)
"Aftos Pou Perimeno" (Anna's Dream Mix)

1997 EPs
Albums produced by Nikos Karvelas
Greek-language albums
1997 remix albums
Remix EPs
Anna Vissi remix albums
Anna Vissi EPs
Minos EMI remix albums
Minos EMI EPs